The Churchill Road Hurdle was a Grade 2 National Hunt hurdle race in Great Britain which was open to horses aged four years or older. It was run at Lingfield Park over a distance of about 2 miles and 3½ furlongs (3,923 metres), and during its running there were ten hurdles to be jumped. It was a limited handicap race, and it took place in January 2006.

The equivalent event in the present National Hunt calendar is the Holloway's Hurdle at Ascot.

Winner
 Weights given in stones and pounds.

References

See also
 Horseracing in Great Britain
 List of British National Hunt races

National Hunt races in Great Britain
Lingfield Park Racecourse
National Hunt hurdle races
Discontinued horse races